Van Every is a surname. Notable people with the surname include:

Dale Van Every (1896–1976), American writer and film producer
Hal Van Every (1918–2007),  American footballer
Jonathan Van Every (born 1979), American baseball player
Kermit Van Every (1915–1998), American aerospace engineer

Surnames of Dutch origin